The Tula constituency (No.183) is a Russian legislative constituency in Tula Oblast. Until 2007 the constituency was based entirely in metropolitan Tula. In 2016 Tula Oblast lost one of its three constituencies, which resulted in Tula constituency taking nearly all of former Shchyokino constituency while shedding half of Tula to Novomoskovsk constituency.

Members elected

Election results

1993

|-
! colspan=2 style="background-color:#E9E9E9;text-align:left;vertical-align:top;" |Candidate
! style="background-color:#E9E9E9;text-align:left;vertical-align:top;" |Party
! style="background-color:#E9E9E9;text-align:right;" |Votes
! style="background-color:#E9E9E9;text-align:right;" |%
|-
|style="background-color:#0085BE"|
|align=left|Eduard Pashchenko
|align=left|Choice of Russia
|
|20.07%
|-
|style="background-color:"|
|align=left|Nadezhda Shaydenko
|align=left|Independent
| -
|17.42%
|-
| colspan="5" style="background-color:#E9E9E9;"|
|- style="font-weight:bold"
| colspan="3" style="text-align:left;" | Total
| 
| 100%
|-
| colspan="5" style="background-color:#E9E9E9;"|
|- style="font-weight:bold"
| colspan="4" |Source:
|
|}

1995

|-
! colspan=2 style="background-color:#E9E9E9;text-align:left;vertical-align:top;" |Candidate
! style="background-color:#E9E9E9;text-align:left;vertical-align:top;" |Party
! style="background-color:#E9E9E9;text-align:right;" |Votes
! style="background-color:#E9E9E9;text-align:right;" |%
|-
|style="background-color:#2C299A"|
|align=left|Aleksandr Lebed
|align=left|Congress of Russian Communities
|
|43.48%
|-
|style="background-color:"|
|align=left|Nikolay Tyaglivy
|align=left|Our Home – Russia
|
|13.09%
|-
|style="background-color:#3A46CE"|
|align=left|Eduard Pashchenko (incumbent)
|align=left|Democratic Choice of Russia – United Democrats
|
|9.78%
|-
|style="background-color:#D50000"|
|align=left|Aleksandr Shikalov
|align=left|Communists and Working Russia - for the Soviet Union
|
|6.33%
|-
|style="background-color:"|
|align=left|Aleksandr Shemyakin
|align=left|Liberal Democratic Party
|
|5.62%
|-
|style="background-color:"|
|align=left|Nikolay Novikov
|align=left|Independent
|
|4.32%
|-
|style="background-color:"|
|align=left|Viktor Levshin
|align=left|Independent
|
|2.16%
|-
|style="background-color:#1C1A0D"|
|align=left|Igor Baldakov
|align=left|Forward, Russia!
|
|1.91%
|-
|style="background-color:"|
|align=left|Nikolay Golub
|align=left|Agrarian Party
|
|1.75%
|-
|style="background-color:#DA2021"|
|align=left|Leonid Chevkin
|align=left|Ivan Rybkin Bloc
|
|1.15%
|-
|style="background-color:#CE1100"|
|align=left|Anatoly Krylov
|align=left|My Fatherland
|
|0.55%
|-
|style="background-color:#000000"|
|colspan=2 |against all
|
|7.03%
|-
| colspan="5" style="background-color:#E9E9E9;"|
|- style="font-weight:bold"
| colspan="3" style="text-align:left;" | Total
| 
| 100%
|-
| colspan="5" style="background-color:#E9E9E9;"|
|- style="font-weight:bold"
| colspan="4" |Source:
|
|}

1997

|-
! colspan=2 style="background-color:#E9E9E9;text-align:left;vertical-align:top;" |Candidate
! style="background-color:#E9E9E9;text-align:left;vertical-align:top;" |Party
! style="background-color:#E9E9E9;text-align:right;" |Votes
! style="background-color:#E9E9E9;text-align:right;" |%
|-
|style="background-color:"|
|align=left|Aleksandr Korzhakov
|align=left|Independent
|-
|26.32%
|-
|style="background-color:"|
|align=left|Eduard Pashchenko
|align=left|Independent
| -
|16.98%
|-
|style="background-color:"|
|align=left|Anatoly Karpov
|align=left|Independent
| -
|15.81%
|-
|style="background-color:"|
|align=left|Nikolay Novikov
|align=left|Independent
| -
|12.18%
|-
| colspan="5" style="background-color:#E9E9E9;"|
|- style="font-weight:bold"
| colspan="3" style="text-align:left;" | Total
| -
| 100%
|-
| colspan="5" style="background-color:#E9E9E9;"|
|- style="font-weight:bold"
| colspan="4" |Source:
|
|}

1999

|-
! colspan=2 style="background-color:#E9E9E9;text-align:left;vertical-align:top;" |Candidate
! style="background-color:#E9E9E9;text-align:left;vertical-align:top;" |Party
! style="background-color:#E9E9E9;text-align:right;" |Votes
! style="background-color:#E9E9E9;text-align:right;" |%
|-
|style="background-color:"|
|align=left|Aleksandr Korzhakov (incumbent)
|align=left|Independent
|
|19.61%
|-
|style="background-color:"|
|align=left|Viktor Rozhkov
|align=left|Independent
|
|17.83%
|-
|style="background:#1042A5"| 
|align=left|Eduard Pashchenko
|align=left|Union of Right Forces
|
|12.15%
|-
|style="background-color:"|
|align=left|Vladislav Sukhoruchenkov
|align=left|Russian All-People's Union
|
|10.82%
|-
|style="background-color:"|
|align=left|Sergey Nikolsky
|align=left|Yabloko
|
|8.54%
|-
|style="background-color:#FCCA19"|
|align=left|Tamara Yurishcheva
|align=left|Congress of Russian Communities-Yury Boldyrev Movement
|
|4.44%
|-
|style="background-color:#C62B55"|
|align=left|Pavel Veselov
|align=left|Peace, Labour, May
|
|2.35%
|-
|style="background-color:"|
|align=left|Igor Salomasov
|align=left|Independent
|
|2.05%
|-
|style="background-color:#E32322"|
|align=left|Aleksey Pokatayev
|align=left|Stalin Bloc – For the USSR
|
|1.64%
|-
|style="background-color:#084284"|
|align=left|Mikhail Filshin
|align=left|Spiritual Heritage
|
|1.51%
|-
|style="background-color:#020266"|
|align=left|Igor Baldakov
|align=left|Russian Socialist Party
|
|1.04%
|-
|style="background-color:"|
|align=left|Yelena Mavrodi
|align=left|Independent
|
|0.73%
|-
|style="background-color:"|
|align=left|Sergey Derbenev
|align=left|Independent
|
|0.43%
|-
|style="background-color:#000000"|
|colspan=2 |against all
|
|14.84%
|-
| colspan="5" style="background-color:#E9E9E9;"|
|- style="font-weight:bold"
| colspan="3" style="text-align:left;" | Total
| 
| 100%
|-
| colspan="5" style="background-color:#E9E9E9;"|
|- style="font-weight:bold"
| colspan="4" |Source:
|
|}

2003

|-
! colspan=2 style="background-color:#E9E9E9;text-align:left;vertical-align:top;" |Candidate
! style="background-color:#E9E9E9;text-align:left;vertical-align:top;" |Party
! style="background-color:#E9E9E9;text-align:right;" |Votes
! style="background-color:#E9E9E9;text-align:right;" |%
|-
|style="background-color:"|
|align=left|Aleksandr Korzhakov (incumbent)
|align=left|United Russia
|
|25.71%
|-
|style="background-color:"|
|align=left|Vladislav Sukhoruchenkov
|align=left|Rodina
|
|20.65%
|-
|style="background-color:"|
|align=left|Viktor Rozhkov
|align=left|Independent
|
|20.09%
|-
|style="background-color:"|
|align=left|Aleksey Berezin
|align=left|Independent
|
|5.10%
|-
|style="background:"| 
|align=left|Mikhail Kharitonov
|align=left|Yabloko
|
|5.03%
|-
|style="background-color:"|
|align=left|Igor Artasov
|align=left|Liberal Democratic Party
|
|2.45%
|-
|style="background-color:"|
|align=left|Aleksey Pokatayev
|align=left|Independent
|
|1.72%
|-
|style="background-color:#164C8C"|
|align=left|Anatoly Kalinin
|align=left|United Russian Party Rus'
|
|1.08%
|-
|style="background-color:"|
|align=left|Andrey Tyunyayev
|align=left|Social Democratic Party
|
|0.31%
|-
|style="background-color:#000000"|
|colspan=2 |against all
|
|16.21%
|-
| colspan="5" style="background-color:#E9E9E9;"|
|- style="font-weight:bold"
| colspan="3" style="text-align:left;" | Total
| 
| 100%
|-
| colspan="5" style="background-color:#E9E9E9;"|
|- style="font-weight:bold"
| colspan="4" |Source:
|
|}

2016

|-
! colspan=2 style="background-color:#E9E9E9;text-align:left;vertical-align:top;" |Candidate
! style="background-color:#E9E9E9;text-align:left;vertical-align:top;" |Party
! style="background-color:#E9E9E9;text-align:right;" |Votes
! style="background-color:#E9E9E9;text-align:right;" |%
|-
|style="background-color: " |
|align=left|Viktor Dzyuba
|align=left|United Russia
|
|60.91%
|-
|style="background-color:"|
|align=left|Tatyana Kosareva
|align=left|Communist Party
|
|11.21%
|-
|style="background-color:"|
|align=left|Ilya Kindeyev
|align=left|Liberal Democratic Party
|
|7.47%
|-
|style="background-color:"|
|align=left|Anatoly Kuznetsov
|align=left|A Just Russia
|
|5.31%
|-
|style="background:"| 
|align=left|Oleg Sakharov
|align=left|Communists of Russia
|
|2.46%
|-
|style="background:"| 
|align=left|Vladimir Dorokhov
|align=left|Yabloko
|
|2.35%
|-
|style="background-color:"|
|align=left|Vladimir Godunov
|align=left|Rodina
|
|1.90%
|-
|style="background:"| 
|align=left|Yelizaveta Batishcheva
|align=left|Party of Growth
|
|1.87%
|-
|style="background-color:"|
|align=left|Yelena Safonova
|align=left|The Greens
|
|1.83%
|-
|style="background:"| 
|align=left|German Konev
|align=left|People's Freedom Party
|
|1.26%
|-
| colspan="5" style="background-color:#E9E9E9;"|
|- style="font-weight:bold"
| colspan="3" style="text-align:left;" | Total
| 
| 100%
|-
| colspan="5" style="background-color:#E9E9E9;"|
|- style="font-weight:bold"
| colspan="4" |Source:
|
|}

2021

|-
! colspan=2 style="background-color:#E9E9E9;text-align:left;vertical-align:top;" |Candidate
! style="background-color:#E9E9E9;text-align:left;vertical-align:top;" |Party
! style="background-color:#E9E9E9;text-align:right;" |Votes
! style="background-color:#E9E9E9;text-align:right;" |%
|-
|style="background-color: " |
|align=left|Viktor Dzyuba (incumbent)
|align=left|United Russia
|
|55.23%
|-
|style="background-color:"|
|align=left|Tatyana Kosareva
|align=left|Communist Party
|
|12.37%
|-
|style="background-color: " |
|align=left|Vladimir Alekseyev
|align=left|New People
|
|6.18%
|-
|style="background-color:"|
|align=left|Dmitry Shishkin
|align=left|A Just Russia — For Truth
|
|5.73%
|-
|style="background-color: "|
|align=left|Vladimir Rostovtsev
|align=left|Party of Pensioners
|
|4.45%
|-
|style="background-color:"|
|align=left|Ilya Kindeyev
|align=left|Liberal Democratic Party
|
|3.55%
|-
|style="background:"| 
|align=left|Yury Moiseyev
|align=left|Communists of Russia
|
|3.44%
|-
|style="background: "| 
|align=left|Olga Podolskaya
|align=left|Yabloko
|
|2.77%
|-
|style="background-color:"|
|align=left|Vladimir Ivashkevich
|align=left|Rodina
|
|1.60%
|-
|style="background-color:"|
|align=left|Aleksey Salnikov
|align=left|The Greens
|
|1.46%
|-
| colspan="5" style="background-color:#E9E9E9;"|
|- style="font-weight:bold"
| colspan="3" style="text-align:left;" | Total
| 
| 100%
|-
| colspan="5" style="background-color:#E9E9E9;"|
|- style="font-weight:bold"
| colspan="4" |Source:
|
|}

Notes

References

Russian legislative constituencies
Politics of Tula Oblast